Sarcohyla cyclada is a species of frog in the family Hylidae. It is endemic to the Sierra Madre de Oaxaca of Mexico.

Its natural habitats are temperate forests, subtropical or tropical moist montane forests, and intermittent rivers. It is threatened by habitat loss.

Sources

Endemic amphibians of Mexico
Fauna of the Sierra Madre de Oaxaca
Amphibians described in 2000
Taxonomy articles created by Polbot
cyclada